Bandar-e Emam Khomeyni Rural District is a rural district (dehestan) in Bandar-e Emam Khomeyni District, Mahshahr County, Khuzestan Province, Iran. At the 2006 census, its population was 922, in 197 families.  The rural district has 30 villages.

References 

Rural Districts of Khuzestan Province
Mahshahr County